Inocellia is the Palaearctic type genus of the family Inocelliidae: belonging to the snakeflies and their allies.  Distribution records are from mainland Europe and Asia: especially in the more temperate zones.

Species
The following are included in BioLib.cz:
 Inocellia aspouckorum C.-k. Yang, 1999
 Inocellia bhutana H. Aspöck et al., 1991
 Inocellia bilobata U.Aspöck et al., 2011
 Inocellia biprocessus Liu et al., 2010
 Inocellia brunni Navás, 1915
 Inocellia cheni Liu et al., 2010
 Inocellia cornuta U.Aspöck et al., 2011
 Inocellia crassicornis (Schummel, 1832)
 Inocellia digitiformis Liu et al., 2010
 Inocellia elegans Liu et al., 2009
 Inocellia frigida Navás, 1915
 Inocellia fujiana C.-k. Yang, 1999
 Inocellia fulvostigmata U. Aspöck & H. Aspöck, 1968
 Inocellia hainanica Liu et al., 2013
 Inocellia hamata Liu et al., 2010
 Inocellia indica Liu & Hajong, 2015
 Inocellia japonica Okamoto, 1917
 Inocellia longispina U.Aspöck et al., 2011
 Inocellia nigra Liu et al., 2012
 Inocellia obtusangularis Liu et al., 2010
 Inocellia rara Liu, Aspöck & Aspöck, 2014
 Inocellia rossica Navás, 1916
 Inocellia shinohara U.Aspöck et al., 2009
 Inocellia sinensis Navás, 1936
 Inocellia striata U.Aspöck et al., 2011
 Inocellia taiwana H. Aspöck & U. Aspöck, 1985
 Inocellia yunnanica Liu et al., 2012

References

External Links
 
 

Raphidioptera